Independence Day Award, Bangladesh's highest civilian honours - Winners, 2010-2019:

2010
Ten people and an organisation were awarded. as below:

2011
Two institutions and seven people were awarded .

2012
Ten people received the award.

2013
The award was given to eight people.

2014
Nine people and one institution were awarded.

2015
The award was given to eight people.

2016
The award was given to fourteen people and one organization.

2017
The award was given to fifteen people and an organization.

2018
Eighteen people were awarded.

2019
Thirteen people and an organization were awarded.

References

Civil awards and decorations of Bangladesh